Jennifer Chan may refer to:

Jennifer Tilly (born 1958), American actress
Jennifer Chan (musician), former radio personality and singer-songwriter from Hong Kong
Jennifer Chan (artist), Canadian media artist
Jennifer Dy Chan, Filipino Olympian archer